Allocasuarina trichodon is a shrub of the genus Allocasuarina native to an area along the south coast in the Great Southern and Goldfields-Esperance regions of Western Australia.

It is found in rocky skeletal soils and granitic hillsides.

Taxonomy
This plant was first described by Miquel in 1845 as Casuarina trichodon, and this was revised to Allocasuarina trichodon by L.A.S.Johnson in 1982.

References

External links
  Occurrence data for Allocasuarina trichodon from The Australasian Virtual Herbarium

trichodon
Rosids of Western Australia
Fagales of Australia